Ellen Fiedler ( Neumann, born 26 November 1958 in Demmin, Mecklenburg-Vorpommern) is a former East German 400 metres hurdler.

She won the bronze medal at the 1988 Summer Olympics in Seoul, in a career best time of 53.63 seconds. This ranks her third among German 400 m hurdlers, only behind Sabine Busch and Cornelia Ullrich.

She also won the 1981 IAAF World Cup event, took the silver medal in the hurdles at the 1980 World Championships in Athletics, won the bronze medal at the 1983 World Championships and finished sixth at the 1986 European Championships. At the 1983 World Championships she also won a gold medal in the 4 × 400 metres relay. Although it was Gesine Walther, Sabine Busch, Marita Koch and Dagmar Rübsam who ran in the final, Fiedler had run in the qualifying round.

Fiedler represented the sports club SC Dynamo Berlin, and became East German champion in 1981, 1982 and 1983.

Fiedler is 1.76 metres tall; during her active career she weighed 66 kg.

International competitions

References

1958 births
Living people
People from Demmin
East German female hurdlers
German female hurdlers
Olympic athletes of East Germany
Olympic bronze medalists for East Germany
Athletes (track and field) at the 1988 Summer Olympics
World Athletics Championships athletes for East Germany
World Athletics Championships medalists
Medalists at the 1988 Summer Olympics
Olympic bronze medalists in athletics (track and field)
Goodwill Games medalists in athletics
World Athletics Championships winners
Competitors at the 1986 Goodwill Games
Sportspeople from Mecklenburg-Western Pomerania